Aglaopheniidae is a family of hydrozoans.

Genera
According to the World Register of Marine Species, these genera belong to this family:
 Aglaophenia Lamouroux, 1812
 Aglaophenopsis Fewkes, 1881
 Carpocladus Vervoort & Watson, 2003
 Cladocarpoides Bogle, 1984
 Cladocarpus Allman, 1874
 Gymnangium Hincks, 1874
 Lytocarpia Kirchenpauer, 1872
 Macrorhynchia Kirchenpauer, 1872
 Monoserius Marktanner-Turneretscher, 1890
 Nematocarpus Broch, 1918
 Streptocaulus Allman, 1883
 Taxella Allman, 1874
 Wanglaophenia Vervoort & Watson, 2003

References

 
Plumularioidea
Cnidarian families